Jared Dines (born October 6, 1989) is an American YouTuber and musician who is known for metalcore-themed and adjacent videos, covers, parodies, and his own original music.

Career
Dines worked as a recording engineer before pursuing YouTube full time. He started his YouTube channel to promote his band, They Charge Like Warriors, in 2011. Dines later gained popularity from his metal covers of pop songs. His following grew as he collaborated with other artists such as Rob Scallon.

In 2015, Dines co-founded the band Rest, Repose with Ryan "Fluff" Bruce. He left the project in 2019 to focus on his group Daddy Rock. Dines was also a member of metalcore band Dissimulator.

Dines, in competition with Steve Terreberry, became known for playing guitars with an unusual amount of strings. In 2017, he was scammed when trying to purchase a 17 string instrument from a fraud luthier. In response, Ormsby Guitars made him a custom 18 string guitar. This guitar was auctioned off, raising $20,000 for charity.

In 2018, Dines toured with heavy metal band Trivium. He partly replaced front man Matt Heafy, who had to leave the tour prematurely due to his wife's pregnancy. Dines and Trivium further collaborated on a cover of "Better Now" by Post Malone. In October 2019, he performed on stage with Breaking Benjamin.

In April 2020, Dines appeared on the cover of Guitar World magazine, the first YouTuber to do so. In 2020, Music Man released his signature Stingray guitar. On December 4, 2020, he released a collaborative EP with Trivium vocalist and guitarist Matt Heafy under the name Dines X Heafy. The video for "Dear Anxiety", which is the first track, was released on the same day to coincide with the release of Dines X Heafy.

In March 2021, Dines joined with vocalist Howard Jones and producer Hiram Hernandez to release "The Blade" as part of a new project named Sion. Their self-titled debut album was released on November 26, 2021.

Discography

Solo work
List adapted from Spotify.

Collaborations

Guest appearances
 Leo
 Redemption Song (Metal Cover) (2016)
 Redemption Song (Metal Cover)
 Californication (Metal Version) (2017)
 Californication (Metal Version) (feat. Jared Dines, Rabea Massaad, Rob Scallon, Garrett Peters, Eric Caderone, Robert Baker)

 Navigator
 Ironclad (2017)
 Sentinel (feat. Jared Dines & Justin Hockaday)

 Shrezzers
 Relationships (2019)
 E.M.O.J.I.Q.U.E.E.N. (feat. Jared Dines & TWild)

 Charlie Parra del Riego
 Chaos and Redemption (2019)
 Moonsault (feat. Jared Dines & Lucas Moscardini)
 B Sides II (2021)
 Charlie Parra VS Jared Dines

 Ignoration
 Rap Metal Verse (2020)
 Rap Metal Verse

 Vermicide Violence
 The Praxis of Prophylaxis (2020)
 Coronaviscerated

 CrazyEightyEight
 Killing In the Name(2020)
 Killing in the Name (feat. Marcus Bridge, Courtney LaPlante, Tyler Tate, Jared Dines, Michael Martenson, Nathan Kane, Linzey Rae, Jake Impellizzeri, David Thompson)

 Jonathan Young
 Young's Old Covers (2013-2016) (2021)
 Never Gonna Give You Up

 66samus
 Hulk Smash METAL (2022)
 Hulk Smash Metal (feat. Jared Dines & Ola Englund)

See also
 List of YouTubers

References

External links
 Official instagram

American YouTubers
Music YouTubers
1989 births
Living people
21st-century American guitarists
People from Seattle
American heavy metal guitarists
21st-century drummers
American heavy metal drummers
American heavy metal singers
21st-century American singers
American video bloggers